The Victor R. Yanitelli, S.J. Recreational Life Center, known today as the Run Baby Run Arena, is a multipurpose athletic facility on the campus of Saint Peter's University, a private, coeducational Roman Catholic university in Jersey City, New Jersey, United States. Notable for its air-supported "bubble," the building opened in 1975 at a cost of $6 million and is named after the 17th president of the college.

The facility is the home of the Saint Peter's Peacocks men's and women's basketball, volleyball, tennis, swimming and diving teams. For men's basketball games, collapsible bleachers are expanded to cover two of the main gymnasium's three full courts and provide a seating capacity of 3,200. For the women's games, only one of the bleachers is opened.

The building also houses an Olympic-size swimming pool with 1- and 3-meter diving boards, a fitness center, a weight room, a racquetball court, and a squash court. The offices for the Department of Athletics are located on the third floor while the Department of Recreation and Intramural Sports is in the basement.

Students often refer to the building simply as "The Bubble" due to the air-supported roof, which is one of the most recognizable landmarks on the campus and in Jersey City. The Bubble covers five roof-top tennis courts and a jogging track. The tennis nets can be removed to provide facilities for indoor athletic practices as well as a venue for intramural sporting events.

Renovation to Run Baby Run Arena
On July 22, 2020, Saint Peter’s University announced that through a $5 million lead gift from Thomas P. Mac Mahon, they would begin a phased renovation of the Yanitelli Center. The renovation would include a creation of a more modern basketball/volleyball arena. Mac Mahon, a 1968 graduate of Saint Peter's, and a member of the Saint Peter's University Board of Trustees, decided to honor his former 1967–68 teammates by naming the renovated space the "Run Baby Run Arena" after that team's nickname for its high-scoring offense. The new arena debuted on November 1, 2021, with Saint Peter's defeating New Jersey City University 90–66 in an exhibition game.

Notable events
On January 9, 2008, the Yanitelli Center hosted a campaign rally for Barack Obama in his successful bid to become to the Democratic candidate in the 2008 U.S. presidential election.

On November 17, 2009, Saint Peter's hosted Monmouth University in a men's basketball game, with a 6:00 a.m. start time, as part of ESPN's Tip-Off Marathon. The Peacocks prevailed, 58-34.

The arena hosted watch parties during Saint Peter's improbable Elite Eight run in the 2022 NCAA Division I men's basketball tournament. The Peacocks became the first ever 15-seed to accomplish the feat.

See also
 List of NCAA Division I basketball arenas

References

External links
 The Victor R. Yanitelli, S.J. Recreational Life Center

College basketball venues in the United States
Indoor arenas in New Jersey
Basketball venues in New Jersey
Saint Peter's Peacocks basketball
Sports venues in New Jersey
Sports in Hudson County, New Jersey
Buildings and structures in Jersey City, New Jersey
Sports venues completed in 1975
Sports venues in the New York metropolitan area
1975 establishments in New Jersey
College volleyball venues in the United States